The Damned Don't Cry is a 1950 American film noir crime-drama directed by Vincent Sherman and featuring Joan Crawford, David Brian, and Steve Cochran. It tells of a woman's involvement with an organized crime boss and his subordinates. The screenplay by Harold Medford and Jerome Weidman was based on the story "Case History" by Gertrude Walker. The plot is loosely based on the relationship of Bugsy Siegel and Virginia Hill. The film was directed by Vincent Sherman and produced by Jerry Wald. The Damned Don't Cry is the first of three cinematic collaborations between Sherman and Crawford, the others being Harriet Craig (1950) and Goodbye, My Fancy (1951).

Cast

Uncredited (in order of appearance)

Reception

Box office
The movie was a hit. According to Warner Bros., it earned $1,540,000 in the U.S. and $671,000 in other markets.

According to Variety, the film earned $1.4 million in the U.S. and Canada in 1950.

Critical response
When the film was released, the reviews were mixed, even though the box office was considered good. The New York Times critic Bosley Crowther was tough on the film in his review. He wrote "Miss Crawford as the 'fancy lady' runs through the whole routine of cheap motion-picture dramatics in her latter-day hard-boiled, dead-pan style...A more artificial lot of acting could hardly be achieved" He added "And Kent Smith, as a public accountant whom Miss Crawford lures into the syndicate, plays a Milquetoast so completely that his whole performance seems a succession of timid gulps. Steve Cochran as a tricky West Coast mobster and Selena Royle as a vagrant socialite do their jobs in a conventional B-story, A-budget way. Vincent Sherman's direction is as specious as the script."

Modern critics are generally more sympathetic. James Travers in 2012 stated: "It is not hard to account for the popular appeal of The Damned Don't Cry. The plot may be far-fetched and the characters absurdly exaggerated, but the film is otherwise well-constructed (using the familiar film noir device of the extended flashback) and well-performed by a well-chosen ensemble of acting talent.

Film critic Craig Butler called the film "a ridiculous melodrama that is fairly poor as real drama but is quite enjoyable as camp." He added "Damned starts out as if it were one of Crawford's earlier 'poor gal makes good' flicks, but it quickly becomes lurid and unbelievable. As is often the case in her later vehicles, Damned finds Crawford in a one-dimensional world and asks that she find ways of giving the illusion of depth to her character."

Critic Dennis Schwartz liked the film, Crawford's work and its direction. He wrote "A dreary crime drama following the formula of Flamingo Road, which also starred Joan Crawford. It is efficiently directed by Vincent Sherman...Joan Crawford gives a solid performance as the gangster's moll who discovers when it's too late that she took the wrong path."

Slant critic Jeremiah Kipp wrote "The direction by hack Vincent Sherman is adequate and humble before Joan, though some scenes feel like the transition into the editing room was hardly smooth. (At least two insert shots feel wobbly and jarring.) But Crawford gets what she wants, and that's all we really came for, no? Like the star in question, this diva showcase knows what it is and what it's good at. If you don't like it, why are you still here?"

References

External links
 
 
 
 
 

1950 films
1950 crime drama films
American crime drama films
American black-and-white films
Film noir
Films directed by Vincent Sherman
Films shot in California
Warner Bros. films
Films scored by Daniele Amfitheatrof
1950s English-language films
1950s American films